Avatar: Music from the Motion Picture is the soundtrack album to the 2009 James Cameron film Avatar, with music composed, co-orchestrated and conducted by James Horner. The album's deluxe edition, featuring six bonus tracks, was released by Atlantic Records on April 19, 2010 to promote the DVD release of the film.

Album information
Composer James Horner scored the film, his third and final collaboration with Cameron after Aliens and Titanic. Horner recorded parts of the score with a small chorus singing in the Na'vi language in March 2008. He also worked with Wanda Bryant, an ethnomusicologist, to create a music culture for the alien race. Horner took advice from his assistant, and they put an unusual number of virtual instruments in this project. The first scoring sessions with the Hollywood Studio Symphony, took place in spring 2009.  Leona Lewis sang the theme song, "I See You". An accompanying music video, directed by Jake Nava,  premiered on MySpace on December 15, 2009.

A bonus track called "Into the Na'vi World" is available exclusively through the official site. It was not included on the physical and digital releases of the soundtrack.

Nominations
The score was nominated for Best Original Score at the 82nd Academy Awards, but lost to Up. "I See You" was nominated for a Golden Globe in the Best Original Song category for the 67th Golden Globes.

Track listing

Instrumentation
 Strings: 32 violins, 22 violas, 10 violoncellos, 8 double basses
 Woodwinds: 2 flutes, 2 oboes, 3 clarinets, 3 bassoons
 Brass: 10 French horns, 4 trumpets, 5 trombones, 1 tuba
 Percussion: 5 members
 3 members on piano/synth, 2 harps, 40 members of choir

Chart positions
The album has also charted on the Billboard 200 album chart on the week of January 2, 2010, debuting at number 172. The following week it climbed the chart to gain a new peak at number 119, and then the following week it leaped to number 32. On the week of January 23, 2010 the soundtrack hit its current peak at number 31.

I See You
"I See You" entered the Irish Singles Chart on the 14th January 2010 at number 47.

References

Film scores
Avatar (franchise) mass media
Avatar (2009 film)
James Horner albums
Science fiction soundtracks
2009 soundtrack albums
Atlantic Records soundtracks